Puke Toropa Mountain is a mostly ice-covered mountain in the Royal Society Range of Antarctica. It was named by the New Zealand Geographic Board (NZGB) in 1994. Its name is Māori in origin and means "circular hill."

Mountains of Victoria Land
Scott Coast